Allognathus graellsianus is a species of land snail in the family Helicidae, the true snails. It is endemic to Mallorca, one of Spain's Balearic Islands. This taxa is the type species of the genus Allognathus.

The snail lives in cracks in rocks and walls and is only active when it rains.

Description 
A. graellsianus presents a thin globose shell. It has from 4 to 4 ½  whorls of fast growth, showing 5 bands well separated and usually discontinued. The aperture is oval-rounded with a reddish brown reflected peristome. The umbilicus is completely closed.

Distribution 
The species is distributed along northwestern Tramuntana Mountains (western Mallorca), cohabiting in many localities with A. hispanicus.

References

External links 
 http://luisjavierchueca.com/research-3/allognathus/

Graellsianus
Endemic fauna of the Balearic Islands
Molluscs of Europe
Gastropods described in 1853
Taxonomy articles created by Polbot